Tomás Federico (born 18 May 1998) is an Argentine professional footballer who plays as a midfielder.

Career
Federico got his career underway with San Martín of the Primera División.
 He was put on the substitutes bench by caretaker manager Floreal García as they travelled to the Estadio Monumental Antonio Vespucio Liberti to face River Plate on 24 February 2019, with Federico later coming off the bench in place of Gonzalo Lamardo as San Martín lost 2–1.

On 28 January 2020, Federico was signed by Serie C club Avellino.

Career statistics
.

References

External links

1998 births
Living people
People from Rafaela
Argentine footballers
Association football midfielders
Argentine Primera División players
San Martín de Tucumán footballers
U.S. Avellino 1912 players
Argentine expatriate footballers
Expatriate footballers in Italy
Sportspeople from Santa Fe Province